Maryna Piddubna (born 7 May 1998) is a Ukrainian Paralympic swimmer.

Career

Piddubna has a visual impairment and competes in S11-class races.

She competed at the 2012 Paralympic Games and won a bronze medal at the 2016 Paralympic Games in the 50 metre freestyle S11 event. Liesette Bruinsma from the Netherlands also won a bronze medal in the race as they both finished in 31.23 seconds.

She won bronze medals at the World Para Swimming Championships in 2013 and 2015 both of which were in the 100 metre backstroke S11 event. She competed again in 2019 where she won a gold medal in the 50m freestyle S11 event, silver medals in the 100 metre freestyle S11 and 200 metre individual medley SM11 events and a bronze medal in the 100 metre backstroke S11 event.

She also competed at the World Para Swimming European Championships in 2014, where she won a bronze medal in the 100 metre backstroke S11 event and in 2018 where she won a gold medal and broke the world record in the 50 metre freestyle S11, won silver medals in the 100 metre freestyle S11 and 200 metre individual medley events and won a bronze medal in the 100 metre backstroke S11 event.

She was awarded with the Order of Princess Olga, third class, for her performance at the 2016 Paralympic Games.

References

1998 births
Living people
Ukrainian female backstroke swimmers
S11-classified Paralympic swimmers
Paralympic swimmers of Ukraine
Paralympic bronze medalists for Ukraine
Paralympic medalists in swimming
Swimmers at the 2012 Summer Paralympics
Swimmers at the 2016 Summer Paralympics
Swimmers at the 2020 Summer Paralympics
Medalists at the 2016 Summer Paralympics
Medalists at the 2020 Summer Paralympics
Medalists at the World Para Swimming Championships
Medalists at the World Para Swimming European Championships
Recipients of the Order of Princess Olga, 3rd class
Paralympic swimmers with a vision impairment
Ukrainian blind people
Ukrainian female freestyle swimmers
Ukrainian female medley swimmers